, formed in 1896, is a major rolling stock manufacturer based in Nagoya, Japan. In 1996, it abbreviated its name to "日本車両" Nippon Sharyō. Its shortest abbreviation is Nissha "日車". It was a listed company on Nikkei 225 until 2004. It is listed on the Tokyo Stock Exchange and Nagoya Stock Exchange as ticker 7102. In 2008, Central Japan Railway Company (JR Central) became the majority shareholder (50.1%) of the financially struggling Nippon Sharyo making the firm a "consolidated subsidiary" of JR Central. In July 2012 Nippon Sharyo USA started production in their new facility in Rochelle, Illinois. The facility closed at the end of October 2018 due to a lack of orders.

Notable projects

Shinkansen ("bullet train") trainsets
 0 series
 100 series
 200 series
 300 series
 500 series
 700 series
 N700 series
 E2 series
 Odakyu Electric Railway trainsets
 Odakyu 1000 series
 Odakyu 2000 series
 Odakyu 3000 series
 Odakyu 4000 series
 Odakyu 30000 series EXE
 Odakyu 50000 series VSE
 Odakyu 60000 series MSE
 Odakyu 70000 series GSE
 Linimo maglev train
 Keisei Electric Railway trainsets
 Keisei 3000 series
 Keisei 3050 series
 Keisei AE100 series
 Keisei AE series
 Nearly all Meitetsu trains

Roca Line
 Toshiba EMU
 Buenos Aires Underground
 Nagoya 250/300/1200 series (Retired in 2019)
 Nagoya 5000 series

SuperVIA Série 500
 Porto Alegre Metro EMUs

Toronto Transit Commission work cars
 RT10 Garbage car 1967 – Tokyo Rose retired in 2000 and scrapped
 RT12 Electric locomotive 1968 (design similar to JNR Class DE locomotive), retired 2009 and scrapped
 RT13 Centre cab crane 1968 – with car and crane cabs
 RT22 Flat car 1973 – formerly wash car RT-17 and rebuilt 1996
 RT54 flat car 1973
 Union Pearson Express Diesel Multiple Units
 Nippon Sharyo DMU (jointly with Sumitomo Corporation) 2014

Manila Light Rail Transit System Line 1 (jointly with Kinki Sharyo)
 LRTA 1200 class

Singapore MRT EMU
 C751B
 C151

Taiwan Railway Administration
 EMU700 local/commuter train
 EMU800 local/commuter train
 DMU3100 express train
 TEMU 2000 Tilting trains
 Taipei Metro
 Taipei Metro C371
Taiwan High Speed Rail
 THSR 700T

Next Generation Bi-Level Passenger Rail Car
Los Angeles County Metro Rail P865 and P2020
 Northern Indiana South Shore Line EMUs
 Maryland MARC Train single-level push-pull coaches (jointly with Sumitomo Corporation)
 Bi-level gallery cars for Chicago Metra, Virginia VRE, and San Francisco Bay Area Caltrain
 Highliner bi-level EMUs for Metra and South Shore Line
 Sonoma–Marin Area Rail Transit Nippon Sharyo DMU (jointly with Sumitomo Corporation)

I.F.E EMUs Working on Caracas-Cua commuter line Railway System Ezequiel Zamora (Central)

Rheostatic series (KRL Rheostatik Mild Steel and Stainless) (The train was also made by Kawasaki Heavy Industries and Hitachi):
 Built 1976: Has 2 doors and uses mild steel body types
 Built 1978,1983,1984: Has 3 doors and uses mild steel body types
 Built 1986,1987: Has 3 doors and uses stainless steel body types
All Rheostatic EMUs have stopped operating in the Jabodetabek lines and is currently waiting to be scrapped.

Shinko Diesel Multiple Units (a.k.a. KRD MCW 301 and KRD MCW 302) are used for short-distance lines such as Surabaya-Lamongan, Surabaya-Sidoarjo, etc.

 KRD MCW 301 Built 1976: Has 2 doors and uses mild steel body types
 KRD MCW 302 Built 1978,1980,1982,1987: Has 3 doors and uses mild steel body types

KRD MCW 301 and 302 initially uses the Shinko DMH17H engine and Niigata TCR 2.5 transmission

Note: The DMUs built in 1976 are now used as regular loco-hauled trains without engines. The DMUs made in 1978, 1980, & 1982 upwards are refurbished with a Cummins Engine (NT885-R) and Voith turbo (T211re.3) transmission.

The new rolling stock, known as the MRTJ 1000, was built specifically for the Jakarta MRT

Wartime involvement

Nippon Sharyo, in 1936, built the JNR Class C56 steam locomotive number C56 31, which was used in 1943 to open the infamous Thai-Burma Railway, as stylized in the movie The Bridge Over the River Kwai, built by over 100,000 Allied POW and other slave labourers. This restored steam engine now sits in the foyer of the Yasukuni War Museum in Tokyo. Japanese veteran groups raised funds to return the locomotive from Thailand to Japan in 1979.

During World War II, Nippon Sharyo, like many major Japanese companies, drew upon prisoner of war labour to maintain war production. The POW camp at Narumi provided Allied POW forced labour for Nippon Sharyo.

References

External links

  
 Existing steam locomotives built by Nippon Sharyo

Locomotive manufacturers of Japan
Rolling stock manufacturers of Japan
Tram manufacturers
Japanese brands
Manufacturing companies based in Nagoya
Companies listed on the Tokyo Stock Exchange
Companies listed on the Nagoya Stock Exchange
Japanese companies established in 1896
Vehicle manufacturing companies established in 1896
Electric vehicle manufacturers of Japan
Rail infrastructure manufacturers